Kimiti is a department of Sila Region in Chad. Its chief town is Goz Beida.

Subdivisions 
The department of Kimiti is divided into seven sub-prefectures:

 Goz Beida
 Koukou-Angarana
 Tissi
 Adé
 Mogororo
 Kerfi
 Moudeïna (or Madiouna)

Administration 
Prefects of Kimiti (since 2008)

 October 9, 2008: Rozzi Haliki

References 

Departments of Chad